Peter James Falsey (April 24, 1891 – May 23, 1976) was a Major League Baseball player with the Pittsburgh Pirates. He went 0-1. Falsey was born in New Haven, Connecticut, and died in Los Angeles, California, on May 23, 1976.

References

Further reading

Articles
 "Yale '12 13, New Haven H. S. 1". The Boston Globe. Apr 13, 1909  
 United Press (May 22, 1909). "Bridgeport High Is Defeated by New Havens". The Bridgeport Evening Farmer.
 Jepson, Benjamin (Summer 1911). "Report of the Supervisor of Music". Annual Report of the Board of Education of the New Haven City School District for the year Ending December 31, 1911.
 "Yale Faculty Bars Falsey". The Buffalo Commercial. February 19, 1913.
 "Falsey Back With Yale Squad". The Christian Science Monitor. May 7, 1913
 "Pete Falsey of Yale Signed by Pittsburgh Club". The Bridgeport Evening Farmer. July 10, 1914.
 "What Do You Want to Know? Sports Queries Answered". The Pittsburgh Press. August 3, 1914.
 "Falsey, Pirates' Eli Recruit, Looks Good to Fred Clarke". The Boston Globe. August 6, 1914.
 "Falsey Is Released". The Pittsburgh Press. August 10, 1914.
 "Eli Diamond Stars Won't Join Outfit; Have Been Advised Not to Be Professionals". The Washington Times. March 20, 1916.
 "Pete Falsey a False Alarm". The Winnipeg Tribune. August 11, 1916.
 "Red Sox Held to Tie". Asbury Park Evening Press. October 16, 1916.
 "Keating in Great Form Holds Red Sox to Tie Score". The Bridgeport Evening Farmer. October 16, 1916.
 "Ty Cobb's Team Holds Red Sox 3-3; Ruth Pitches; All Regulars in Lineup but Gardner and Hooper; 'Peach' Some First Baseman". The Boston Post. October 16, 1916.
 "Yale War Record: Installment 43". The Yale Alumni Weekly. October 18, 1918.
 McFadden, Ed (February 24, 1947). "Diamond Dust". The Salt Lake Tribune.
 Coffey, Wayne (April 9, 1986). "Inside Pitch: Introducing Basebull's Greatest Players". The New York Daily News.

Books
 Yale University (1914). Seven Year Record, Yale 1914 New Haven: The Tuttle, Morehouse & Taylor Company. 1922. pp. 55, 231.
 Yale University (1916). Catalogue of the Officers and Graduates of Yale University in New Haven, Connecticut, 1701-1915. New Haven: Yale University. 1916. p. 395.
 Library of Congress (1947). Catalog of Copyright Entries, Third Series, Volume 1, Part 1A, Number 1; Books; January-June, 1947. Washington, DC: Copyright Office, Library of Congress. p. 383.
 Rubin, Sam (2003). Baseball in New Haven. Charleston, SC: Arcadia Publishing. p. 28. .

External links

Baseball Almanac

1891 births
1976 deaths
Pittsburgh Pirates players
Yale Bulldogs baseball players
Baseball players from New Haven, Connecticut